Goldstream, Alaska (colloquially the Goldstream Valley) (Lower Tanana: Khudodleeneek'a) is a census-designated place (CDP) in Alaska, United States. It is part of the Fairbanks, Alaska Metropolitan Statistical Area. As of the 2010 census, the population was 3,557 (31st place in the list of cities and census-designated places of Alaska).

Geography

Demographics

As of the census of 2010, there were 3,557 people, 1,579 households, and 884 families residing in the CDP. There were 1,837 housing units. The racial makeup of the CDP was 89% White, 0.6% Black or African American, 3.4% Native American, 0.7% Asian, 0.0% Pacific Islander, 0.7% from other races, and 5.5% from two or more races. 2.5% of the population were Hispanic or Latino of any race.

See also 
 Fox, Alaska
 Steele Creek, Alaska

References

Census-designated places in Alaska
Census-designated places in Fairbanks North Star Borough, Alaska